Nabil Gholam (born 1962 in Beirut) is a French-Lebanese architect, urban planner and the founder of Nabil Gholam Architects (ngª). In 2010, Monocle magazine has called Gholam a "leading" architect in Lebanon. In Modern Architecture: A Critical History, critic Kenneth Frampton cited Gholam's colony of holiday chalets at Faqra as one of "two works [which] promise a renewal of Lebanese architecture".

Career

Nabil Gholam first studied Architecture at the UP-Paris Villemin (now merged into ) and received the French  degree in 1986. He then completed studies in Urban Planning at the Graduate School of Architecture of Columbia University in New York City.

From 1988 to 1994 he worked at Ricardo Bofill Taller de Arquitectura. In 1994 he came back to Beirut and founded Nabil Gholam Architects (ngª).

In Beirut, ngª had its first office on Rue Gouraud in 1994, then in 1995 on Abdelwahab al-Inglizi Street in Achrafieh. In 2002 the firm moved to the Beydoun building on Deir Nasra Street, and in 2011 to a converted industrial building in the Palais de justice neighborhood.

In 2004 the firm established a secondary office in Barcelona, and moved it to Seville in 2010.

Works

This list only includes those ngª projects that were actually built, ranked by chronological order of completion.
 Sabbagh and Codsi House in Yarze near Beirut (1996–1999)
 National Shipping Company Headquarters, Beirut (1996–2001)
 Emaar Towers 1 & 2, Dubai (2000–2003)
 Home for Tania Fares in the mountains above Beirut (2000–2004)
 La Pajarita family home in Carmona, Spain, with Ana Corberó (2002–2009) 
 Demerdjian House in Rabieh near Beirut (2003–2009)
 Platinum Tower in Beirut, with Ricardo Bofill Taller de Arquitectura (2002–2009)
 Kempinski Hotel in Aqaba, Jordan (2004–2009), on the Red Sea waterfront
 Buildings at Saifi 146 (2001–2009), Foch 94 (2004–2010), and Waqf Foch (2002–2011) in Beirut Central District and Saifi Village
 Clouds Faqra Club in Faqra (2005–2010)
 Garden View building, Beirut (2004–2011)
 CMA CGM Beirut Headquarters (2005–2011)
 Harbor Tower, Beirut (2006–2012), a 24-storey residential development
 House for Philippe Jabre on the ruins of a 1930s villa destroyed during the Lebanese Civil War above Beirut (2005–2012).
 Irani Oxy Engineering Complex (IOEC) on the campus of American University of Beirut (2005–2013), the first project in Lebanon registered for a LEED certification
 Sky Gate tower in Beirut (2007–2014), Beirut's tallest building at the time of completion and now its third-tallest
 Beirut Marina Yacht Club & Zaitunay Bay (2002–2014), in association with Steven Holl and L.E.FT. Architects
 Saifi Plaza first phase, Beirut (2005–2017)
 Qortuba Oasis (Wadi Qortuba), Riyadh (2012–2018)
 Golden Tower, Jeddah (2011–2018)
 Dalfa Seafront on Corniche Beirut, Ras Beirut (2016–2019)
 Doha Oasis complex (2010–2020) in Doha, Qatar

Awards

 2005 CityScape Award for Doha Gardens development design in Khobar, Dammam metropolitan area, Saudi Arabia
 2006 MIPIM AR Future Projects Award, overall winner and winner in the "Masterplanned Communities" category, also for Doha Gardens in Khobar
 2012 Green GOOD Design Award from Chicago Athenaeum and European Centre for Architecture Art Design and Urban Studies, for the IOEC Building at AUB
 Honorable Mention in Architectural Design / Residential Architecture from Architecture Masterprize, for the Jabre house

Gallery

Notes

External links
Official website

1962 births
Living people
Lebanese architects
French people of Lebanese descent
Columbia Graduate School of Architecture, Planning and Preservation alumni